Ballota (horehound) is a genus of flowering evergreen perennial plants and subshrubs in the family Lamiaceae. native to temperate regions. The Mediterranean region has the highest diversity in the genus, with more isolated locations in South Africa, Central Asia,  northern Europe, and the islands of the eastern North Atlantic. It is found in rocky and waste ground.

Ballota is paraphyletic and will eventually be re-circumscribed. It is closely related to Moluccella and Marrubium. Some of its species had previously been placed in Marrubium. Other species have already been split to Pseudodictamnus

Ballota species are used as food plants by the larvae of some Lepidoptera including Coleophora case-bearers: C. ballotella, C. lineolea (which has been recorded on B. nigra) and C. ochripennella.

Species

 Ballota adenophora Hedge - Saudi Arabia 
 Ballota andreuzziana Pamp. - Libya
 Ballota antalyensis Tezcan & H.Duman - Turkey
 Ballota antilibanotica Post - Syria, Lebanon
 Ballota byblensis Semaan & R.M.Haber - Lebanon
 Ballota cristata P.H.Davis - Antalya region of Turkey
 Ballota glandulosissima Hub.-Mor. & Patzak - Turkey
 Ballota grisea Pojark. - Caucasus
 Ballota kaiseri Täckh. - Sinai
 Ballota larendana Boiss. & Heldr. - Turkey
 Ballota luteola Velen - Saudi Arabia 
 Ballota macrodonta Boiss. & Balansa - Nigde region of Turkey
 Ballota nigra L. - most of Europe; North Africa, Middle East as far east as Iran; naturalized in New Zealand, Argentina, North America
 Ballota philistaea Bornm. - Israel
 Ballota platyloma Rech.f. - Iran
 Ballota saxatilis Sieber ex C.Presl  - Middle East from Turkey to Saudi Arabia
 Ballota sechmenii Gemici & Leblebici - Turkey
 Ballota vellerea Maire, Weiller & Wilczek - Morocco

References

 
Lamiaceae genera
Taxa named by Carl Linnaeus
Flora of the Mediterranean Basin